Pinchas Burstein (1927–1977), later known as Maryan S. Maryan, was a Polish-born Jewish post-expressionist painter.

Early life

Pinchas Burstein (Bursztyn) was born in Nowy Sącz, Poland, on January 1, 1927, second son of an Orthodox Jewish family. His father was a baker, Avraham Schindel, his mother was Gitel Burstein. Burstein was 12 when Nazis invaded Poland in 1939. He was first shot in the neck when he delivered food to Jews in hiding. Burstein was given an inmate number A17986. At the night of his arrival he was chosen as one of 22 Jews who was to be shot, but survived. In 1945, when the Soviet army liberated prisoners of the Auschwitz death camp, Burstein was found "wounded among bodies in a lime pit", and had his leg amputated. After the war, he left Poland in 1946 and spent two years in Germany in the camps for displaced persons. Burstein was the only person of his family who survived the Holocaust.

Israel and France
In 1947 Burstein moved to Palestine. Later he said in an interview that he was persuaded to move there in a displaced persons camp, but once he arrived he was found "handicapped" and sent to kibbutz that had "a residence for elderly and disabled immigrants".

After I received the certificate, they left me alone on the platform. No one came to me. I found a pile of oranges and sat on it. I waited. Yes, I waited for someone to come and take me to the kibbutz, as that official had promised me. I waited for several hours and suddenly I was horrified. I began to see the truth. No one was waiting for me. This clerk, his name will be omitted, lied to me. They left me on the platform. After a while I realized that it was worse than a concentration camp, because I was not alone there, we went to die together, whereas on the platform at the port of Haifa I went to die alone.

He left that kibbutz after five months when he was admitted in the Bezalel Academy of Art and Design in Jerusalem. He saw the Israeli War of Independence and creation of the state of Israel, and witnessed "the siege of the city". His first solo exhibition was at the YMCA in Jerusalem. In 1950 Burstein arrived in Paris, where he studied at the Ecole Nationale Superieure des Beaux-Arts for three years, including two in the lithography workshop.

In Paris Pinchas Burstein took a new name, Maryan Bergman, "which he "borrowed" from his schoolmate in Bezalel, the painter Marian (Meir Marinel), who committed suicide a few years later." There he got several big exhibitions and was "commissioned to design a tapestry for the Monument to the Unknown Jewish Martyr in Paris, and was awarded the Prix des Critiques d’Art at the Paris Biennale. ... His first solo exhibition in the United States was held at the famed André Emerrich Gallery in 1960."

USA

He moved to New York in 1962 after he was denied the French citizenship. Together with his wife, Annette, a Holocaust survivor he met in France, he arrived in the USA aboard of Leonardo da Vinci. In 1969 he received American citizenship and officially changed his name to Maryan S. Maryan.

His best-known works, Ecce Homo movie, "After Goia" painting, and series of paintings called Personnage, were done in New York. Personnage painting were described by Grace Glueck as
brutal, exaggerated Piccasoid forms in which could be seen the influence also of Dubuffet and the CoBrA group of young European painters that included Karel Appel and Asger Jorn. They were mocking, clownish zombies with mask like faces and lolling tongues, suggesting visual realizations of characters from Gunter Grass's Tin Drum. Later, they got wider and more gestural, with maybe a touch of de Kooning, winding up as slobbering, almost illegible bundles of mouths, flailing limbs, and flying organs.

In 1971 Maryan had a mental breakdown, and temporarily lost his speech. To overcome this state, his psychiatrist told him to draw to depict "his life-story". In a year Maryan created a series of drawings, later titled Ecce homo; he "completed 9 notebooks with 478 drawings, each 20x30 cm". Daniel Kupermann analyzed these drawings as a psychoanalyst, and find them to be a "blend of infantile and monstrous, with their incontinent bodies and with the omnipresence of death in the form of grotesque terror-filled faces, seem to reveal an attempt to find a language in images that is able to transmit the experience of the obscene tragedy lived by the inmates of concentration camps".

In 1975 Maryan and Kenny Schneider created a 90-minute film in his hotel, also titled Ecce homo. Katarzyna Bojarska describes the film as

a series of staged recollections where photographic images and reproductions of Maryan’s paintings, drawings, and lithographs alternate with a disturbing performance. Maryan reenacts Holocaust memories with the use of numerous accessories such as an M16 gun, dummies of SS officers, a straitjacket, ropes, and paint. The film opens with the following sequences of images appearing one after another: the Virgin Mary, women in robes during a Ku-Klux-Klan ceremony, Maryan himself in a black dress resembling a cassock with his arms stretched wide (as if crucified), Yasser Arafat, the Pope on a stool, images of crucifixion, a black cloth with a white swastika on it, black crosses on the white robes of Ku-Klux-Klan members, the shooting of Maryan as a Nazi, black tape covers his eyes and mouth, then pictures of Pinochet, Napoleon, Maximilian Kolbe (with the camp number 214510672 on his chest), piles of corpses from the My Lei massacre, Christ in a crown of thorns covered in paint. Religious motifs, iconic images of historical events and people, press clips and holy images are all montaged in a sequence that stimulates imagination and affect, driving both to the very limits of alarm.

Maryan lived in Chelsea Hotel in New York. He died of a heart attack in 1977 in his hotel room, and was buried in the Montparnasse cemetery in Paris.

References

Further reading

External links
 "My Name is Maryan" exhibition at Tel Aviv Museum of Art
 Works at MoMA
 La ménagerie humaine (in French)

1927 births
1977 deaths
20th-century American painters
20th-century American male artists
American male painters
American contemporary artists